The following is a list of aircraft carriers of France. Fifteen aircraft carriers have served the navy or been proposed since the 1910s.

As of 2022, one French carrier—Charles de Gaulle (R91)—remains in service of the French government.

Key

Seaplane carriers

Foudre

Commandant Teste

Escort carriers

Avenger class

Fleet carriers

Béarn

Joffre class

Independence class

Colossus class

Clemenceau class

Verdun

Charles de Gaulle

PA 2

PA-NG

Helicopter carriers

Jeanne d'Arc

PH 75

See also 
 List of active French Navy ships
 List of aircraft carriers
 List of aircraft carriers of the United States Navy
 List of aircraft carriers of the Royal Navy
 List of aircraft carriers by country

Notes

France